<

Luke Skaarup (born September 9, 1979) is a professional engineer and also a retired professional strongman from Canada who competed actively in the sport of strongman from 2007 to 2015. During his competitive career, he held many records, most notably the Canadian record for heaviest atlas stone ever lifted in competition, the Ontario record for heaviest deadlift, and the Ontario Record heaviest dumbbell press. He competed in over sixty competitions with his top placings being the 2 x Ontario's Strongest Man Champion (2012 & 2014), 4th at North America's Strongest Man (2014), and 8th at the World Amateur Strongman Championships (2012).

He has competed in strongman for 9 years with 2 years of powerlifting and 5 years of bodybuilding competitions prior to that. Luke has been lifting weights seriously for over 20 years and began when he was 16 years of age to assist his physical development and strength for football. He is married and is a father of four children (Brayden, Gabrielle, Logan, and Charlotte). Luke is a Professional Engineer and graduated from Lakehead University with a Degree in Mechanical Engineering (First Class Standing). He is employed as a senior leader for a large energy company in Ontario. Luke is the oldest of five children. He has a younger brother and three sisters. His brother Dan Skaarup was also a competitive strength athlete and former bodybuilder. While Luke has retired from competing in strength sports himself, he still weight trains regularly and coaches youth football.

Ontario Records 
 18" Deadlift (1150 lbs), 
 Deadlift (780 lbs),
 Circus Dumbbell (230 lbs),
 Farmer's walk (310 lbs per hand for 160 ft in 23.5s), 
 Yoke (850 lbs for 100 ft in 20.5s)

Canadian Records
He lifted the heaviest atlas stone ever lifted in competition, that weighed 454 lbs to 38.5". This same stone has also been lifted by JF Caron at Canada's Strongest Man in 2016.

Personal records
Powerlifting (competition):
 Squat -  equipped
 Bench press - 
 Deadlift - 

Powerlifting (gym):
 Squat - 
 Bench press - 
 Deadlift - 

Strongman:
 Log lift for Max Weight - 
 18" Deadlift - 
 log press (370 lbs and 300 lbs x 8 reps), 
 Military press (310 lbs x 5 reps),
 Push press 2" Axel (380 lbs x 2 reps),
 Tire Flip (1300 lbs and 1100 lbs x 5 reps),
 Bench press (350 lbs x 16 reps and 225 lbs x 30 reps),
 Front Squat (540 lbs x 3 reps),
 Natural Stone (450 lbs),

Profile

 Biceps: 54 cm (22 inches)
 Neck : 48 cm (19 inches)
 Calves: 48 cm (22 inches)
 Chest: 142 cm (56 inches)
 Quadriceps: 80 cm (31.5 inches)
 Height: 182 cm (6 feet 0 inches)
 Weight: 140 kg (300 pounds)

Strongman Competition History

https://web.archive.org/web/20131009083731/http://lukeskaarup.com/contests.htm

COMPLETED CONTESTS

2015
 Canada's Strongest Man 2015 – Dubreuilville, ON, CAN – 9th Place - injured
 USA Classic- Giant's Live Qualifier – Martinsville, IN, USA – 8th Place- DNF- re-tore left biceps
 North America's Strongest Man 2015 – Warwick, QC, CAN – 9th Place. DNF- Torn Quad and left biceps.
 Ontario's Strongest Man 2015 – Toronto, ON, CAN – 2nd Place
 Kings of Strength – Ancaster, ON, CAN –1st Place.

2014
 Bavarian Strongman Competition-Oktoberfest – Kitchener, ON, CAN – 3rd Place
 Canada's Strongest Man 2014 – Quebec City, QC, CAN – 10th Place. Did Not Finish- torn biceps and coracobrachialis in right arm
 Thunder Bay's Strongest Man – Thunder Bay, ON, CAN – 1st Place
 North America's Strongest Man 2014 – Warwick, QC, CAN – 4th Place
 Ontario's Strongest Man 2014 – Thunder Bay, ON, CAN – 1st Place
 Adrenaline Pro Strongman – Regina, SK, CAN – 1st Place

2013
 Dubreuilville Strongman Challenge PRO- Dubreuilville, ON, CAN- 5th Place. Injured- Torn Right Calf
 North America's Strongest Man 2013 – Gatineau, QC, CAN – 11th Place. Injured- Torn Right Calf
 Canada's Strongest Man 2013 – Quebec City, QC, CAN – 6th Place
 Saskatoon Ex- Frank's Red Hot Strongman2013 – Saskatoon, SK, CAN – 1st Place
 Thunder Bay's Strongest Man 2013 – Thunder Bay, ON, CAN – 1st Place
 Strongman Champions League Canada- North America's Strongest Man Challenge – Warwick, QC, CAN – 6th Place
 Ontario's Strongest Man 2013 – Thunder Bay, ON, CAN – 4th Place
 Strongman Champions League Canada- Force Supreme – Sherbrooke, QC, CAN – 9th Place

2012
 Dubreuilville Strongman Challenge PRO- Dubreuilville, ON, CAN- 3rd Place
 Canada's Strongest Man 2012 – Quebec City, Quebec, CAN – 6th Place
 Thunder Bay's Strongest Man 2012 – Thunder Bay, ON, CAN – 1st Place
 Ontario's Strongest Man 2012 – Kitchener, ON, CAN – 1st Place
 Battle at the Beach II – Milwaukee, WI, USA – 3rd Place (tie)
 Toronto Pro Strongman – Toronto, ON, CAN – 2nd Place
 Fort Frances Pro Strongman 2012 – Fort Frances, ON, CAN – 2nd Place
 World Amateur Strongman Championships 2012 – Columbus, OH, USA – 8th Place

2011
 Dubreuilville Strongman Challenge PRO- Dubreuilville, ON, CAN- 3rd Place
 Saskatoon Ex Strongman 2011 – Saskatoon, SK, CAN – 1st Place
 Winkler Harvest Fest Strongman 2011 – Winkler, MB, CAN – 1st Place
 Thunder Bay's Strongest Man 2011 – Thunder Bay, ON, CAN – 1st Place
 Tbaytel Dryden Pro Strongman – Dryden, ON, CAN – 3rd Place
 Ontario's Strongest Man 2011 – Toronto, ON, CAN – 5th Place
 Fort Frances Strongman 2011 – Fort Frances, ON, CAN – 1st Place
 Teddy Bob's Strongman – Winnipeg, MB, CAN – 1st Place

2010
 Bavarian Strongman Challenge- Kitchener, ON, CAN- 1st Place
 Dubreuilville Strongman Challenge PRO- Dubreuilville, ON, CAN- 4th Place
 Winkler Harvest Fest Strongman – Winkler, MB, CAN – 1st Place
 Motors & Muscles – Thunder Bay, ON, CAN – 2nd Place
 Ontario's Strongest Man – Cornwall, ON, CAN – 3rd Place
 Woodstock Strongman – Woodstock, ON, CAN – 1st Place
 World Amateur Strongman Championships – Columbus, OH, USA – 22nd Place

2009
 North America's Strongest Man- Gatineau, QC, CAN- 12th Place. Injured- torn left biceps
 Canada's Strongest Man- Quebec City, QC, CAN- 8th Place
 Quebec Cup-Cheneville Pro – Cheneville, QC, CAN – 8th Place
 Ontario's Strongest Man – Kitchener, ON, CAN – 3rd Place
 Rockbrune Bros Strongman – Barrie, ON, CAN – 1st Place
 Woodstock Strongman – Woodstock, ON, CAN – 2nd Place

2008
 Bavarian Strongman Challenge- Waterloo, ON, CAN- 3rd Place
 Animal Strongman Series- FINALS- Woodstock, ON, CAN- 1st Place
 Dubreuilville Strongman Challenge PRO- Dubreuilville, ON, CAN- 9th Place. Injured- torn right ACL.
 Canada's Strongest Man under 105 kg – Comox Valley, BC, CAN – 2nd Place (tie)
 Ontario's Strongest Man – Wawa, ON, CAN – 6th Place
 Ontario's Strongest Man Qualifier – Wawa, ON, CAN – 2nd Place
 Power of Dads Strongman – Ottawa, ON, CAN – 3rd Place
 Animal Strongman Series- 2nd Leg- Woodstock, ON, CAN- 1st Place
 Animal Strongman Series- 1st Leg- Woodstock, ON, CAN- 8th Place

2007
 Steel City Strength Challenge- Hamilton, ON, CAN- 2nd Place
 Woodstock Strongman-novice- Woodstock, ON, CAN- 1st Place
 Ontario's Strongest Man – Ottawa, ON, CAN – 9th Place

References

External links
http://www.ironmind.com/ironmind/opencms/Articles/2013/May/Strongman_Jean-Francois_Caron_Wins_in_Sherbrooke.html
http://www.netnewsledger.com/2013/07/08/luke-skaarup-sixth-in-international-strongman-competition/

1979 births
Canadian strength athletes
Canadian people of Dutch descent
Living people